Çiftlikköy is a town and district of Yalova Province in the Marmara region of Turkey. The mayor is Ali Murat Silpagar (AK Party).

References

 

Populated places in Yalova Province
Districts of Yalova Province